Péter Szőr (17 July 1970 – 12 November 2013) was a Hungarian computer virus and security researcher, entrepreneur and author.

Born in Balatonfüred, Veszprém County, Szőr began an interest in computer viruses in 1990. A University of Pannonia graduate, he authored several virus-related books, and was renowned for his work. From 2011 until his death, he worked for a McAfee antivirus firm working on a new solution to stop viruses.

Péter Szőr died on 12 November 2013, aged 43.
In May 2014, Virus Bulletin introduced the Péter Szőr Award to be given annually in recognition of the best piece of technical security research done that year.

References

1970 births
2013 deaths
People from Veszprém County
Hungarian expatriates in Finland
People associated with computer security
Hungarian businesspeople
20th-century Hungarian male writers
21st-century Hungarian male writers